Toussaint Dedy Kalibo (born 1 November 1992) is a Ivorian professional footballer who plays as forward for Burkinabe club ASFA Yennenga. He previously played for Ghana Premier League side Medeama S.C.

Career

Medeama SC 
In 2019, Kalibo was signed by Tarkwa-based side Medeama SC on a 3-year deal. He played in 7 matches and scored 3 goals during the 2019 GFA Normalization Committee Special Competition, to help Medeama to a 3rd-place finish in group A. During the 2019–20 Ghana Premier League season, he played only a league match due to being knocked by malaria for several weeks before the league was cancelled as a result of the COVID-19 pandemic. He was registered for the 2020–21 Ghana Premier League season, but he only featured in 3 matches before leaving the club on 28 January 2021.

ASFA Yennenga 
On 28 January 2021, after spending two seasons with the Ghanaian club Medeama SC, Toussaint was transferred to Burkinabe club ASFA Yennenga on a permanent deal after the two clubs reached an agreement.

References

External links 

 

Living people
1992 births
Ivorian footballers
Ghana Premier League players
Medeama SC players
ASFA Yennenga players
Burkinabé Premier League players
Ivorian expatriate footballers
Expatriate footballers in Ghana
Ivorian expatriate sportspeople in Ghana
Expatriate footballers in Burkina Faso
Ivorian expatriate sportspeople in Burkina Faso
Association football forwards